Felimare garciagomezi is a species of colourful sea slug or dorid nudibranch, a marine gastropod mollusc in the family Chromodorididae.

Distribution 
This species was described by Edmunds from Ghana as a variation of Hypselodoris tricolor. It was named as a new species in the revision of Ortea et al.

References

Endemic fauna of Ghana
Chromodorididae
Gastropods described in 1996